Bijago or Bidyogo is the language of the Bissagos Archipelago of Guinea-Bissau. There are some difficulties of grammar and intelligibility between dialects, with the Kamona dialect being unintelligible to the others.

Dialects are as follows:

 Anhaki on Canhabaque (Roxa) Island
 Kagbaaga on Bubaque Island
 Kajoko on Orango and Uno Islands.
 Kamona on the northern Caravela and Carache Islands

Characteristics

The Kajoko dialect is one of the few in the world known to use a linguolabial consonant, the voiced stop , in its basic sound system (Olson et al. 2009).

Classification
Bijago is highly divergent. Sapir (1971) classified it as an isolate within the West Atlantic family. However, Segerer showed that this is primarily due to unrecognized sound changes, and that Bijago is in fact close to the Bak languages. For example, the following cognates in Bijago and Joola Kasa (a Bak language) are completely regular, but had not previously been identified (Segerer 2010):

See also
Bijogo word list (Wiktionary)

References

 Olson, Kenneth S., D. William Reiman, Fernando Sabio & Filipe Alberto da Silva. 2009. The voiced linguolabial plosive in Kajoko. Chicago Linguistic Society (CLS) 45(1), 519-530.
 Segerer, Guillaume. La langue bijogo. Oxford : Pergamon Press, 1997.
 Segerer, Guillaume. Lʼorigine des Bijogo : hypothèses de linguiste. In Gaillard, Gérald (Ed), Migrations anciennes et peuplement actuel des Côtes guinéennes, Paris : LʼHarmattan, 2000, pp. 183–191
 Segerer, Guillaume. La langue bijogo de Bubaque (Guinée Bissau). Louvain, Paris : Editions Peeters, 2002. 310 pp.
 Guillaume Segerer & Florian Lionnet 2010. "'Isolates' in 'Atlantic'". Language Isolates in Africa workshop, Lyon, Dec. 4

Bak languages
Languages of Guinea-Bissau